Nwodo is a surname. Notable people with the surname include:

Emmanuel Nwodo (born 1974), Nigerian boxer
John Nnia Nwodo (born 1952), Nigerian lawyer and economist
Okwesilieze Nwodo (born 1950), Nigerian politician

Surnames of Nigerian origin